The Cleveland International Film Festival (CIFF) is an annual film festival based in Cleveland, Ohio. It is the largest film festival in Ohio. It was first held in 1977, showing eight films over a period of eight weeks at the Cedar Lee Theatre. It has since grown and in 2019 consisted of 213 feature films and 237 short films from 71 countries, and over 105,000 in attendance. 2022 will mark the 46th year for the CIFF.

History
The festival started in 1977 with eight films over eight weeks at the Cedar Lee Theatre in Cleveland Heights. In 1991, the festival relocated to Tower City Cinemas in downtown Cleveland. Additional programming and events have also been held at other local venues, including the Capitol Theatre on Cleveland's west side, Shaker Cinemas on Shaker Square, and the Cedar Lee Theatre. In 2013, the festival extended to Akron and Oberlin, screening films at the Akron Art Museum, the Akron-Summit County Public Library, and the Apollo Theatre in Oberlin. With this expansion has come an increase in attendance: in 2019, the festival hosted over 105,000 attendees. Starting with CIFF43, in 2018, the Festival began offering CIFF East and CIFF West, held at venues on the east and west sides of Cleveland, respectively.

After 30 years at Tower City Cinemas, CIFF announced that it would move to Playhouse Square ahead of the 2021 festival. Due to the global COVID-19 pandemic, the 44th festival, its last at Tower City Cinemas, was canceled. The festival moved to a digital streaming platform for the first time in its history over a two-week period at the end of April 2020. For the 45th festival, with the pandemic continuing through 2020 into 2021, the festival opted to continue with a digital festival, dubbed CIFF45 Streams. 2022 will mark the festival's first time at Playhouse Square for its 46th iteration.

Recently, the festival has focused on films that dwell on social issues, including feminism, environmentalism, Jewish and Israeli issues, and LGBT issues. The festival also has a focus on family-friendly films and films from Central and Eastern Europe.

The Cleveland International Film Festival is sometimes confused with an earlier film festival in Cleveland with a similar name - the 1948 to 1956 Cleveland Film Festival - the first film festival in the country to honor sponsored films in all categories.

Awards
The festival offers multiple awards and honors to its films and filmmakers, including for Best Documentary and for Best Central and Eastern European film. In 2006, the festival introduced The Greg Gund Memorial Standing Up Film Competition, which honors films focused on social justice and activism and is sponsored by The George Gund Foundation in honor of Greg Gund, who died in a plane crash in 2005. Another major award is the Roxanne T. Mueller Audience Choice Award for Best Film, which has been awarded annually since 1988 and is named in honor of the late Roxanne Mueller, who was a film advocate and film critic for The Plain Dealer.

Roxanne T. Mueller Audience Choice Award for Best Film
 2022 - From the Hood to the Holler
 2021 - Ala Kachuu – Take and Run
 2020 - Not Going Quietly
 2019 - Princess of the Row
 2018 - The Drummer and the Keeper
 2017 - Big Sonia
 2016 - Romeo Is Bleeding
 2015 - Becoming Bulletproof
 2014 - Matt Shepard is a Friend of Mine
 2013 - Good Ol' Freda
 2012 - Under African Skies
 2011 - Vincent Wants to Sea
 2010 - Louder Than a Bomb
 2009 - Cherry Blossoms
 2008 - One Bad Cat: The Reverend Albert Wagner Story
 2007 - Darius Goes West
 2006 - Live and Become
 2005 - Mad Hot Ballroom
 2004 - Born Into Brothels
 2003 - Spellbound
 2002 - Autumn Spring
 2001 - Big Eden
 2000 - The Butterfly
 1999 - Return with Honor
 1998 - Character
 1997 - Shall We Dance?
 1996 - Fiddlefest
 1995 - The Sum of Us
 1994 - Backbeat
 1993 - Into the West
 1992 - Enchanted April
 1991 - Cross My Heart
 1990 - Cinema Paradiso
 1989 - The Beast
 1988 - The Grand Highway

References

External links

Cleveland Film Society website

Film festivals in Ohio
Cinema of Cleveland
Film festivals established in 1977
Festivals in Cleveland
1977 establishments in Ohio